Schmalenberg is a municipality in Südwestpfalz district, in Rhineland-Palatinate, western Germany and belongs to the municipal association Waldfischbach-Burgalben.

References

Palatinate Forest
Südwestpfalz